Old Søgne Church is a historic parish church of the Church of Norway in Kristiansand Municipality in Agder county, Norway. It is located in the southeastern part of the village of Tangvall. It was once the main church for the Søgne parish which is now part of the Kristiansand domprosti (arch-deanery) in the Diocese of Agder og Telemark. The white, timber-framed church was built in a long church design in 1640 using plans drawn up by an unknown architect. The church seats about 270 people.

Since that time, this church is no longer regularly used, but it is available for special occasions such as baptisms and weddings.

History
The earliest existing historical records of the church date back to the year 1344, but the church was not new at that time (it was likely founded in the 13th century). In 1604, the parish of Søgne was established when it was separated from the main Oddernes Church parish. The old medieval stave church in Søgne was torn down in the 1630s and a new church was completed on the same site around 1640. It was a long church with a rectangular, timber-framed nave and on the east end was a narrower chancel with a lower roof line that was constructed out of lumber. Some parts of the old stave church were re-used in the new church, including the pulpit. In 1743, a new sacristy was built on the north side of the building. In 1760, a new tower on the west end was constructed.

In 1814, this church served as an election church. Together with more than 300 other parish churches across Norway, it was a polling station for elections to the 1814 Norwegian Constituent Assembly which wrote the Constitution of Norway. This was Norway's first national elections. Each church parish was a constituency that elected people called "electors" who later met together in each county to elect the representatives for the assembly that was to meet in Eidsvoll later that year.

The walls and ceilings of the interior are covered with painted rosemåling decorations of vines and figures from the 17th and 18th centuries and later. The decorations were repainted in the 19th century, first with blue-gray in 1833, and then with white around 1860. In connection with the restoration of the church from 1953 to 1957, the remains of the original decor were restored by curator Finn Krafft.

Media gallery

See also
List of churches in Agder og Telemark

References

Churches in Kristiansand
Wooden churches in Norway
17th-century Church of Norway church buildings
Churches completed in 1640
13th-century establishments in Norway
Norwegian election church